For Love may refer to:

 For Love (album), a 2012 album by Anuhea Jenkins
 "For Love", a 1991 single by Lush
 "For Love", a song by Robert Earl Keen from What I Really Mean
 "For Love", a song by Ringo Starr from Liverpool 8
 "For Love", a song by Crematory from Awake

See also

4 Love, a 2012 album by Kenza Farah

For the Love, a 2007 album by Tracy Lawrence